James Bandinel (19 May 1814 – 1892) was a British clergyman, author and poet.

He was born on 19 May 1814, only son of James Bandinel of the Foreign Office and his wife, Marian Eliza, née Hunter.

Career Synopsis

Publications
Bandinel's literary work met mixed criticism in the press. The Athenaeum Journal speaks of "the harpings of the Rev. James Bandinel" and the Literary Churchman describes his "long and laboured discourse", while the Church of England Quarterly Review notes that his poem entitled "Lufra" was "highly interesting" and its treatment "exceedingly artistic".

There can be small doubt that Bandinel's achievement lies less in reaching a widespread readership (such as the novels of Charles Dickens attracted popular attention) than in his principled, kind, genuine style. He is perhaps unfortunate in having been harshly scrutinised by the national press when, at a local level, his literature was valued and estimated by his parishioners.

Family
Bandinel married, on 28 January 1845, his first cousin, Julia, daughter of Rev. Thomas Le Mesurier. Their children were:

James Julius Frederick Bandinel (1845–1912)Thomas Ranulph Bandinel (1847–1848)Richard Bulkeley Bandinel (1849–1912)David Guido Bandinel (1851-1851)Robert Alexander Bandinel (1852–1853)Margaret Anne Bandinel (1856–1859)Julia Marian Bandinel (1859–1950)

He died 31 December 1892 in Exmouth aged 78.

References

1814 births
1892 deaths
19th-century English Anglican priests
English male poets
19th-century English poets
19th-century English male writers